Sybra primaria is a species of beetle in the family Cerambycidae. It was described by Pascoe in 1865. It is known from Malaysia, Moluccas, and Sulawesi.

References

primaria
Beetles described in 1865